Serhiy Hryn (born 6 June 1994) is a Ukrainian professional footballer who plays as a left winger for Oleksandriya.

Career
Hryn is product of the Shakhtar Donetsk youth academy. In June 2014, he joined Illichivets Mariupol on loan.

He made his debut in the Ukrainian Premier League on 26 July 2014, playing for Mariupol in a game against Volyn Lutsk.

Hryn was nominated as "Best Young Player" of Ukrainian Professional League.

References

External links
 
 

1994 births
Living people
People from Volnovakha
Ukrainian footballers
Ukrainian expatriate footballers
FC Shakhtar Donetsk players
FC Mariupol players
FC Olimpik Donetsk players
Association football midfielders
Ukrainian Premier League players
Ukrainian First League players
NK Veres Rivne players
FC Arsenal Kyiv players
Danish Superliga players
Danish 1st Division players
Vejle Boldklub players
Expatriate men's footballers in Denmark
Ukrainian expatriate sportspeople in Denmark
FC Zorya Luhansk players
FC Oleksandriya players
Sportspeople from Donetsk Oblast